Class 99 is the classification of German narrow gauge locomotives used by the Deutsche Reichsbahn or her successor administrations. It is therefore divided into numerous sub-classes that are listed in this table.

Bibliography 
 Weisbrod, Manfred, Hans Müller and Wolfgang Petznik (1995). Dampflokomotiven deutscher Eisenbahnen. Band 4: Baureihe 99. Berlin: Transpress.

See also 

 Deutsche Reichsbahn 
 Deutsche Bundesbahn
 Deutsche Reichsbahn (GDR)
 List of DRG locomotives and railcars
 Einheitsdampflokomotive

Narrow gauge locomotives
99
99
99
99